Henriëtte Amalia Maria von Anhalt-Dessau (Kleve, 16 August 1666 – Dietz an der Lahn, 18 April 1726) was a Princess consort of Nassau-Dietz.

She was the daughter of John George II, Prince of Anhalt-Dessau, and Henriëtte Catharina of Nassau and the granddaughter of Frederick Henry, Prince of Orange.

Marriage and issue
She married her cousin Henry Casimir II, Prince of Nassau-Dietz, in 1683, at the age of 17.  When Henry Casimir died in 1696, she became regent for their son, John William Friso, who succeeded to his father's titles.  Henriëtte Amalia von Anhalt-Dessau died in 1726, at the age of 59 and was buried in Dietz.

Hendrik Casimir II and Henriëtte Amalia had nine children: 

 William George Friso (1685–1686)
 John William Friso (1687–1711), married Marie Louise of Hesse-Kassel
 Henriëtte Albertine (1686–1754)
 Maria Amalia (1689–1771)
 Sophia Hedwig (1690–1734), married Karl Leopold, Duke of Mecklenburg-Schwerin (26 September 1678 – 28 November 1747) on 27 May 1709 (div. 1710)
 Isabella Charlotte (1692–1757), married Christian, Prince of Nassau-Dillenburg (1688–1739)
 Johanna Agnes (1693–1765)
 Louise Leopoldina (1695–1758)
 Henriëtte Casimira (1696–1738)

Ancestry

References

1666 births
1726 deaths
House of Ascania
Daughters of monarchs